Beluru is a district, in Miri Division, Sarawak, Malaysia.

References 

 

Districts of Sarawak
Miri Division